Romance of the Western Chamber, also known as Way Down West, is a 1927 silent Chinese film drama directed by Hou Yao.

The film is an adaption of the classic Chinese dramatic work Romance of the Western Chamber by Wang Shifu.

Originally consisting of ten film reels, only five have survived.

The 2007 USA DVD release by Cinema Epoch has an additional original musical score composed by Toshiyuki Hiraoka.

Cast 

 Lim Cho Cho - as Cui Yingying, the daughter of the late Prime Minister
 Li Dandan - as Hongniang, the maidservant of yingying
 He Minzhuang (M. C. Noo) - as Madame Cui, the mother of Yingying
 T. K. Kar - as wise student Zhang Gong
 Tsao Yao Dein - as an old monk Fa Pen
 Lee Wha Ming/Li Huamin - as Sung Fei Fu (Tiger Sun), the bandit king
 Lu Ying Lang/Li Yinlan - as monk Wei Hing, the messenger with bō staff
 Wang Longxi - as clever monk
 Hu Chichang - as the White Horse General
 Zhu Yaoting - as the stupid monk
 Huang Ke - as the boy servant

References

Further reading 
 Harris K. (1999), "The Romance of the Western Chamber and the Classical Subject Film in 1920s Shanghai" in Zhang Y. (ed.), Cinema and Urban Culture in Shanghai, 1922-1943. Stanford, CA: Stanford University Press, 1999. pp. 51–73.

External links 
 
 http://www.dvdtalk.com/silentdvd/romance_of_the.html

1927 films
Chinese silent films
Chinese films based on plays
1927 drama films
Films directed by Hou Yao
Chinese drama films
Chinese black-and-white films
Silent drama films